The 1964 Italian presidential election was held in Italy from 16 to 28 December 1964, following the resignation of President Antonio Segni on 6 December 1964 due to health problems. 

Only members of Parliament and regional delegates were entitled to vote, most of these electors having been elected in the 1963 general election. As head of state of the Italian Republic, the President has a role of representation of national unity and guarantees that Italian politics comply with the Italian Constitution, in the framework of a parliamentary system.

Only on the twenty-first round of voting Giuseppe Saragat, the leader of Italian Democratic Socialist Party and former President of the Constituent Assembly, was finally elected President. Saragat was the first left-wing politician to become President of the Republic.

Procedure
In accordance with the Italian Constitution, the election was held in the form of a secret ballot, with the Senators and the Deputies entitled to vote. The election was held in the Palazzo Montecitorio, home of the Chamber of Deputies, with the capacity of the building expanded for the purpose. The first three ballots required a two-thirds majority of the 963 voters in order to elect a president, or 642 votes. Starting from the fourth ballot, an absolute majority was required for candidates to be elected, or 482 votes. The presidential mandate lasts seven years. 

The election was presided over by the President of the Chamber of Deputies Brunetto Bucciarelli-Ducci, who proceeded to the public counting of the votes, and by the Vice president of the Senate Ennio Zelioli-Lanzini, since President Cesare Merzagora was serving as acting President of the Republic.

Proposed nominees 
 Giovanni Leone was the first proposal of the Christian Democracy;
 Umberto Terracini was proposed by the Italian Communist Party;
 Giuseppe Saragat was initially proposed only by Italian Socialist Party and the Italian Democratic Socialist Party;
 Amintore Fanfani was proposed by Christian Democracy's internal opposition;
 Gaetano Martino was proposed by the Italian Liberal Party;
 Pietro Nenni, former partisan and socialist leader, was proposed by left-wing parties from the tenth round of voting.

Chronology
During summer 1964 the so-called Piano Solo prepared by general Giovanni De Lorenzo was conceived to make a coup d'état and overthrow the first centre-left government led by Aldo Moro. The coup was stopped before taking place, as the Italian Socialist Party agreed to reduce its more radical reformist claims. However, on 7 August 1964, during a heated discussion with the Prime Minister Moro and the leader of the Italian Democratic Socialist Party Giuseppe Saragat, President Antonio Segni suffered a serious cerebral hemorrhage in his office at the Quirinal Palace. He only partially recovered and decided to resign on 6 December 1964, citing health matters. Cesare Merzagora, as President of the Senate, became the acting President of the Republic till a new presidential election was called.

On 16 December 1964, the Italian Parliament convened to elect the new President after just two years since last presidential election occurred.

The official candidate of Christian Democracy was the former president of the Chamber of Deputies Giovanni Leone, whose candidacy was immediately contrasted by the former Prime Minister Amintore Fanfani, preferred by the left-wing faction of the party. As they did two years before, communists sustained again Umberto Terracini, while socialists decided to vote for the democratic socialist leader Giuseppe Saragat.

As the count advanced, both Leone and Fanfani decided to retire from the race, while socialists and communists found a common ground on the candidacy of the socialist leader and Deputy Prime Minister Pietro Nenni. Christian Democracy couldn't sustain Nenni since it'd have been meant to vote for a candidate voted by the communists themselves and thus finding the opposition of the more conservative social groups of the country. 

After almost twenty rounds of voting, Christian Democracy decided to not oppose Saragat, a name then married also by socialists and communists. On the twenty-first ballot and after almost two weeks of voting, Giuseppe Saragat was finally elected President by a large margin and sworn in on 29 December 1964.

Results

Notes

References 

Presidential elections in Italy
1964 elections in Italy